Andy Robson is a 1982 British children's television series, produced by Tyne Tees Television, which aired on the ITV network for two series in 1982 and 1983. It was based on Frederick Grice's novel The Courage of Andy Robson, published in 1969.

Plot
Set in Edwardian England and starring Tom Davidson as the eponymous hero, the series concerned the adventures of Andy, who had been sent from a coal mining town in County Durham in North East England, to live with his aunt and uncle in rural Northumberland after his father was injured in a pit accident. The series also starred Stephanie Tague and Stevie-Lee Pattinson as Victoria and Alec, two of Andy's friends in his new surroundings.

Cast

Production

Music
The series' theme tune, "Best of Friends" was written by BA Robertson and Alan Parker and sung by Barbara Dickson. A full song running 3'20" was recorded but never commercially released, although it can be heard on Dickson's official YouTube channel. An abridged version accompanied the closing credits of the television series.

External links
 

1982 British television series debuts
1983 British television series endings
1980s British children's television series
British children's drama television series
Television series by ITV Studios
Television shows produced by Tyne Tees Television
ITV children's television shows
English-language television shows